Karl Leo (born 10 July 1960 in Freiburg im Breisgau, Baden-Württemberg, Germany) is a German physicist.

Career
Leo studied physics at the Albert-Ludwigs-Universität Freiburg and obtained the Diplomphysiker degree with a thesis on solar cells under supervision of Adolf Goetzberger at the Fraunhofer-Institut für Solare Energiesysteme. In 1986 he joined the
Max-Planck-Institut für Festkörperforschung in Stuttgart for a PhD under the guidance of Hans Queisser.
He then joined AT&T Bell Laboratories in Holmdel (New Jersey) as a postdoctoral research associate. In 1991 he joined the RWTH Aachen as an assistant professor and obtained the Habilitation degree. In 1993 he joined the Technische Universitaet Dresden as a professor of optoelectronics. Since 2002 he has been also with the Fraunhofer-Institut für Photonische Mikrosysteme, currently as director.

Achievements
Leo works in the field of semiconductor optics and the physics of thin organic films. In 1992 he discovered Bloch oscillations in a semiconductor superlattice. His work on organic semiconductors led to Organic Light Emitting Diodes with the highest power efficiencies reported and to Organic Solar Cells with leading efficiency values. In 2002 he won the Leibniz award, which is Germany's most prestigious scientific award. In 2021, he was awarded the European Inventor Award in the 'Lifetime Achievement' category.

Awards
 Otto Hahn Medal, Max Planck Society, 1989
 Rudolf-von-Bennigsen-Förderpreis des Landes Nordrhein-Westfalen, 1992
 Gottfried Wilhelm Leibniz Prize, Deutsche Forschungsgemeinschaft, 2002
 European Inventor Award (Lifetime Achievement), 2021

References

External links
 IAPP page of Karl Leo
 Laudatio of the DFG (in German)

1960 births
21st-century German physicists
Living people
Gottfried Wilhelm Leibniz Prize winners
Scientists from Freiburg im Breisgau
20th-century German physicists